Travis Sentell "Gookie" Dawkins (born May 12, 1979) is an American former professional baseball shortstop and current coach. He played in Major League Baseball (MLB) for the Cincinnati Reds and Kansas City Royals.

Career
Drafted by the Cincinnati Reds in the 2nd round of the 1997 Major League Baseball Draft, Dawkins would make his Major League Baseball debut with the Reds on September 3, . His first major league at-bat was on September 4, 1999, at Philadelphia (a game in which the Reds hit nine home runs). Dawkins singled and reached third base on a throwing error. A young Philadelphia Phillies fan seated down the first base line reached over the fence and grabbed the rolling ball during play. The Reds staff later obtained the first major league hit ball for Dawkins by trading with the fan.

Dawkins won an Olympic Gold medal in 2000 while playing for the United States baseball team.

Dawkins spent the  season playing for the Tacoma Rainiers, the Triple-A affiliate of the Seattle Mariners, and the Ottawa Lynx, the Triple-A affiliate of the Philadelphia Phillies. Dawkins was re-signed by the Phillies on December 7, 2007, to a minor league contract.

Dawkins signed with the Chicago White Sox for the  season, and was assigned to their Triple-A team, the Charlotte Knights. Dawkins was traded to the Kansas City Royals on June 11, 2008. He re-signed with the White Sox after the season.
He then signed the Reds in the summer of 2010.

In the 2010 offseason, Dawkins signed a minor league contract with the Charlotte Knights.

Dawkins began his professional coaching career in 2015, where he served as the hitting coach for the Arizona League Reds in Goodyear, Arizona. In 2016, he was named hitting coach for the Cincinnati Reds' Advanced-A Affiliate, the Daytona Tortugas. In 2017, he was promoted to hitting coach of the Reds' Double-A Affiliate, Pensacola Blue Wahoos.
In 2018, he was promoted to manager of the Reds' Rookie-level Affiliate Greeneville Reds.
In 2020, he was promoted to manager of the Reds' Single-A Affiliate Dayton Dragons.

References

External links

1979 births
Living people
African-American baseball coaches
African-American baseball players
American expatriate baseball players in Canada
Baseball players at the 1999 Pan American Games
Baseball players at the 2000 Summer Olympics
Baseball coaches from South Carolina
Baseball players from South Carolina
Billings Mustangs players
Burlington Bees players
Charlotte Knights players
Chattanooga Lookouts players
Cincinnati Reds players
Indianapolis Indians players
Iowa Cubs players
Jacksonville Suns players
Kansas City Royals players
Las Vegas 51s players
Lehigh Valley IronPigs players
Louisville Bats players
Major League Baseball shortstops
Medalists at the 2000 Summer Olympics
Minor league baseball coaches
Minor league baseball managers
New Orleans Zephyrs players
Olympic gold medalists for the United States in baseball
Omaha Royals players
Ottawa Lynx players
Pan American Games medalists in baseball
Pan American Games silver medalists for the United States
People from Newberry, South Carolina
Reading Phillies players
Rockford Reds players
Tacoma Rainiers players
Toledo Mud Hens players
Medalists at the 1999 Pan American Games
21st-century African-American sportspeople
20th-century African-American sportspeople